No Borders Here is the second album (and first to be available outside Canada) by Jane Siberry.

The album's single "Mimi on the Beach" was Siberry's breakthrough hit in her native Canada, and remains one of her most famous songs. Toronto's CFNY was the first radio station in Canada to recognize the song's hit potential. The song's video was also one of the first influential clips on MuchMusic.

Track listing
All songs by Jane Siberry, except as noted.
 "The Waitress" – 2:25
 "I Muse Aloud" – 4:11
 "Dancing Class" – 6:41
 "Extra Executives" (music: Siberry, John Switzer) – 4:26
 "You Don't Need" – 4:25
 "Symmetry (The Way Things Have to Be)" – 4:57
 "Follow Me" – 4:19
 "Mimi on the Beach" – 7:35
 "Map of the World, Pt. 1" – 3:33

Personnel
Jane Siberry – guitar, keyboards, vocals
Al Cross – drums, percussion, LinnDrum
Ken Myhr – guitar
John Switzer – bass, percussion
Additional personnel
Jon Goldsmith – keyboards
Doug Wilde – keyboards
Rob Yale – Fairlight CMI programming

Chart positions
 RPM - 68

References

Jane Siberry albums
1984 albums
Albums produced by Jane Siberry
Duke Street Records albums